Brian Harvey (12 January 1947 - 13 January 2023) is an English former footballer. He is the brother of once-capped England man Colin Harvey.

Player
Harvey played one game for Chester during the 1964–1965 season. In 1966,he graduated from St. Bonaventure University. He then embarked on a career playing in Australia. In 1968, he moved to the United States where he signed with the Dallas Tornado of the North American Soccer League. In September 1971, he moved to Caroline Hill.

Manager
In 1982, Harvey became the head coach of Oklahoma City Slickers, playing in the American Soccer League. That season, he took the Slickers to the championship game and was named the 1982 Coach of the Year. In 1984, the Slickers moved to the United Soccer League where it played as the Oklahoma City Stampede. In 1985, the team moved to Tulsa, becoming the Tulsa Tornados. Harvey remained head coach for each of the team's four seasons. In 1986, Harvey established the men's soccer team at Oklahoma City University. In 1994, he began the women's soccer team.

Personal life
Brian Harvey is the brother of Colin Harvey, who played for and managed his hometown club Everton, as well as representing Sheffield Wednesday, and receiving one cap for England.

References

External links
 NASL stats

1947 births
Living people
American Soccer League (1933–1983) coaches
Dallas Tornado players
English footballers
English expatriate footballers
English football managers
Lone Star Soccer Alliance coaches
North American Soccer League (1968–1984) players
Sheffield Wednesday F.C. players
Chester City F.C. players
South Coast United players
English Football League players
United Soccer League (1984–85) coaches
Association football midfielders
English expatriate sportspeople in the United States
Expatriate soccer players in the United States